The 1965 Omloop Het Volk was the 20th edition of the Omloop Het Volk cycle race and was held on 5 March 1965. The race started and finished in Ghent. The race was won by Noel De Pauw.

General classification

References

1965
Omloop Het Nieuwsblad
Omloop Het Nieuwsblad